Bedford Square is a garden square in the Bloomsbury district of the Borough of Camden in London, England.

History

Built between 1775 and 1783 as an upper middle class residential area, the square has had many distinguished residents, including Lord Eldon, one of Britain's longest serving and most celebrated Lord Chancellors, who lived in the largest house in the square for many years. The square takes its name from the main title of the Russell family, the Dukes of Bedford, who owned much of the land in what is now Bloomsbury.
 
The architect Thomas Leverton is known to have designed some of the houses, although he may not have been responsible for all of them.

The building agreements for Bedford Square were signed by the trustees of the late Duke of Bedford and William Scott and Robert Grews, the builders, in 1776. The first leases, for the entire west side (Nos. 28–39), were granted in November 1776. It seems unlikely that these dozen houses were built within 11 months so building probably started in 1775. Except for No. 46, the south side leases were granted in 1777, the east side in 1777 and 1778 (except Nos. 1 and 10), and the north side in 1781 and 1782 (except Nos. 24–27, granted in 1777). No. 11, which stands in Gower Street but has always been considered part of the square, had a separate building agreement of 1781 and was leased in June 1783. This section was designed and built by Peter Matthias Van Gelder.

The leases were granted by the estate once the shells were built but with internal finishing still to be carried out. No. 23 was the last house to be occupied, its owner moving in during the last quarter of 1784.

The delay in finishing the building of the square can be put down in part to the shortage of money during the American War of Independence. Loans were granted by the trustees of the estate to the builders in order to finance building work from November 1777.

Number 1

Number 1 Bedford Square is one of the great terraced houses of Georgian London and by far the best house in the square. Sir John Summerson described it as a "particularly fine house" in 1945.

Number 1 is almost certainly the work of the architect Thomas Leverton (1743-1824). By his own admission Leverton designed the interiors of both Numbers 6 and 13 Bedford Square  and a number of details in those houses are repeated here. Although it sits outside the uniform symmetrical east side of the square, it has always been part of it and appropriately has always been numbered 1. The house is distinguished by its central entrance, rare for a three bay Georgian terraced house because such an arrangement required an ingenious plan to accommodate the staircase. The front door leads into an entrance hall which is flanked by two separate spaces, an anteroom to the right and the fine stone staircase to the left. With the staircase in the front of the house, Leverton was able to design full width rooms to the rear half which took full advantage of the view over the established gardens of the British Museum. There is a particularly fine decorative plaster ceiling in the first floor rear room.

The house was threatened with demolition by the British Museum in 1860, along with Numbers 2 and 3 and the fourteen houses to the south in Bloomsbury Street, but nothing came of the museum's plans. Then in the early 1930s a new building was planned which would stand only 20 feet from the rear elevation of Number 1. The threat produced an article in Country Life that heralded the house as "a masterpiece of English architecture" and of "exceptional merit". Support came from Sir Edwin Lutyens, former resident of Number 31 Bedford Square for three years from 1915, who described the house as a "most interesting house ... of exceptional quality".  The British Museum's Duveen Gallery was built shortly before the Second World War  and today its plain brick flank wall is the view from the house rather than the gardens of the museum, which was such an important consideration in Thomas Leverton's original designs for the house.

Conservation
Bedford Square is one of the best preserved set pieces of Georgian architecture in London, but most of the houses have now been converted into offices. Numbers 1–10, 11, 12–27, 28–38 and 40–54 are grade I listed buildings.

Garden
The central garden remains private, but is opened to the public as part of the Open Garden Squares Weekend.
The square is Grade II* listed on the Register of Historic Parks and Gardens.

Former occupants
Bedford College, the first place for female higher education in Britain, was originally located in (and named after) Bedford Square (No. 47).

No. 1
Sir Lyonel Lyde Bt., first occupier of the building for ten years until his death in 1791
No. 4
Paul Weidlinger, structural engineer
No. 6
Lord Eldon, Lord Chancellor
No. 8
Frederick Warne & Norman Warne, publishers, of Frederick Warne & Co., who published the Beatrix Potter books
No. 10
Samuel Lyde (brother of Sir Lyonel at No. 1)
Charles Gilpin, MP
No. 11
Henry Cavendish, scientist
No. 13
Harry Ricardo, engine designer, born at the house
No. 19
New College of the Humanities, higher education institution founded by A.C. Grayling - 2012 to 2021
No. 22
Johnston Forbes-Robertson, actor
No. 26
National Council for Voluntary Organisations, 1928 – 1992
No. 30
Jonathan Cape, publishing company
No. 35
Thomas Hodgkin, physician, reformer and philanthropist
No. 35
Thomas Wakley, founder of The Lancet
No. 36
Thomas Wilkinson King, pathologist
No. 41
William Butterfield, architect
Sir Anthony Hope Hawkins, novelist
No. 44
Ottoline Morrell, socialite
Margot Asquith, wife of the Prime Minister H. H. Asquith
No. 48
Elizabeth Jesser Reid, anti-slavery activist and founder of Bedford College for Women
No. 49
Francis Walker, entomologist; before that Ram Mohan Roy, Indian scholar and reformer
No. 52
Used as the contestants' house in the 2010 series of The Apprentice
No. 53
Haydn Brown, surgeon and psychotherapist

See also
Other squares on the Bedford Estate in Bloomsbury included:
Bloomsbury Square
Gordon Square
Russell Square
Tavistock Square
Torrington Square
Woburn Square
List of eponymous roads in London

References

External links
Bedford Square, discussed in Survey of London, Riley & Gomme, 1914

Blue plaques
A number of houses have blue plaques recording famous residents:
 

 

Plaquemap.com London blue plaque scheme — For exact location of these plaques within the square.

Squares in the London Borough of Camden
Grade I listed buildings in the London Borough of Camden
Grade I listed residential buildings
Georgian architecture in the London Borough of Camden
Residential buildings completed in 1783
Bloomsbury
Bedford Estate
Grade II* listed parks and gardens in London
Garden squares in London
Communal gardens